Ben Jordan may refer to:

 Ben Jordan (boxer) (1873-1945), English boxer who took the British World Featherweight Championship in 1899
 Ben Jordan: Paranormal Investigator, a video game for Microsoft Windows.

See also
 B. Everett Jordan (Benjamin, 1896-1974), American businessman and politician, U.S. Senator from North Carolina